Kani Nilam is a 1987 Indian Tamil-language political satire film directed by Arunmozhi, starring Cho. It was released on 14 August 1987.

Plot

Cast 
Cho as Arivarasan
Kutty Padmini as the reporter
Vathiyar Raman as Nagalingam

Production 
The title of the film was originally Kani Nilam Vendum. The censor board initially refused to certify the film because of its negative portrayal of politicians (which the board believed would lead to anti-government beliefs), and many derogatory references to politicians based in Tamil Nadu. After the film faced three months of limbo, it was cleared by the board with a U certificate after 18 cuts. According to Cho, however, the film was not meant to defame or vilify anyone: "It only shows corruption at the political level seeping down to the grassroots".

Release and reception 
Kani Nilam was released on 14 August 1987. Nandalala of The Indian Express wrote the film "proves to be somewhat of a letdown [...] the end product is a slipshod patchwork which will not cut ice either with the groundlings or with the more discerning". Jayamanmadhan of Kalki also gave the film a negative review, saying innovative angles, neat editing and gripping direction were missing. The film was later selected for screening at the Pan African Film Festival.

References

External links 
 

1980s political satire films
1980s Tamil-language films
Censored films
Indian political satire films